The Baojun E100 is a battery electric city car that has been manufactured by SAIC-GM-Wuling (SGMW) since 2017 under the Baojun marque. It is a two-seater car with two doors and a hatch at the rear. It is the first vehicle in Baojun's electric microcar series.

Overview 

Baojun, in a General Motors-Chinese joint venture known as SAIC-GM-Wuling, commenced production of the model in 2016. It is the first Baojun electric car.
The Baojun E100 was originally only available in Guangxi and Qingdao. Prior to mid-2018, the geographic market for the Baojun E100 was limited to Guanxi province, a southern province bordering Vietnam. However, as of June of 2018, Baojun began to expand the E100’s market by selling the city car in the Northern province of Shandong, in the area of Qingdao.

The Baojun E100 is powered by a 29 kW and 110 Nm electric motor producing 38 hp and 81 lb-ft torque, capable of a max speed of 100 km (62 miles) per hour. The battery of the E100 is a Lithium-ion battery with a battery capacity of 14.9 kWh and can be charged fully in 7.5 hours. For suspension, the E100 uses an independent front-wheel suspension and single-arm rear suspension. The E100 also features anti-lock brakes with electronic brakeforce distribution, electric power steering, and an electronic parking brake. The turning radius of the E100 is 3.7 meters.

2018 update
The Baojun E100 offered a range of 96 miles at launch in 2016. But by June 2018, Baojun has refreshed the electric car and offers 124 miles of range.

The 2018 E100 comes in 2 variants called the Zhixing and the higher trim Zhixiang. The lower Zhixing trim received minor interior upgrades during the 2018 facelift, while the higher-end Zhixiang trim is updated with automatic folding mirrors and a parking camera. After the tech and range updates in 2018, E100 prices were adjusted slightly to RMB 46,800 ($7,257) and RMB 59,800($9,275) after subsidies.

See also 
 Baojun E200
 Baojun E300

References

External links
 Baojun EV
 Baojun E100 Official Site

Electric city cars
E100
Cars introduced in 2017